Bebresh Point (‘Nos Bebresh’ \'nos 'be-bresh\) is a point projecting 1.3 km from the northwest coast of Liège Island in the Palmer Archipelago, Antarctica forming the north side of the entrance to Palakariya Cove and the west side of the entrance to Boisguehenneuc Bay.  Situated 7.7 km southwest of Moureaux Point and 11.3 km north-northeast of Chauveau Point.

The point is named after the settlement of Bebresh in northern Bulgaria.

Location
British mapping in 1978.

Map
 British Antarctic Territory.  Scale 1:200000 topographic map No. 3197. DOS 610 - W 63 60.  Tolworth, UK, 1978.
 Antarctic Digital Database (ADD). Scale 1:250000 topographic map of Antarctica. Scientific Committee on Antarctic Research (SCAR), 1993–2016.

References
 Bebresh Point. SCAR Composite Gazetteer of Antarctica.
 Bulgarian Antarctic Gazetteer. Antarctic Place-names Commission. (details in Bulgarian, basic data in English)

External links
 Bebresh Point. Copernix satellite image

Headlands of the Palmer Archipelago
Bulgaria and the Antarctic
Liège Island